Booths Corner is an unincorporated community in Bethel Township in Delaware County, Pennsylvania, United States. Booths Corner is located at the intersection of Pennsylvania Route 261 (Foulk Road) and Pennsylvania Route 491 (Naamans Creek Road).

Booths Corner is named after Thomas Booth, who became a merchant in the village in 1854 and served as postmaster.  The Booth family in Bethel can be traced back to Robert Booth who emigrated to Pennsylvania from Yorkshire, England in 1712.

Notable people
Francis Harvey Green - educator, poet and lecturer

References

Unincorporated communities in Delaware County, Pennsylvania
Unincorporated communities in Pennsylvania